Sterpu River may refer to:
 Sterpu, another name for the upper course of the Lotrioara in Sibiu County, Romania
 Sterpu River (Olt), in Olt County, Romania